Belmont is a Grade II* listed country house near Lyme Regis, South West England. The house was occupied for many years by the English novelist John Fowles, and is now part of the Landmark Trust.

References

External links
Belmont - Landmark Trust

Grade II* listed houses
Buildings and structures in Lyme Regis
Houses completed in 1785
Landmark Trust properties in England
Grade II* listed buildings in Dorset